Leida Laius (26 March 1923 – 6 April 1996, in Tallinn) was an Estonian film director.

In 1962 she graduated from All-Union State Institute of Cinematography. Since 1960 she worked at Tallinnfilm.

Filmography
 Õhtust hommikuni (short film, 1962) 
 Mäeküla piimamees (1965)
 Libahunt (1968)
 Ukuaru (1973)
 Sündis inimene (documentary, 1975)
 "Lapsepõlv (documentary, 1976)
 Jäljed lumel (documentary, 1978)
 Kõrboja peremees (1979)
 Kodulinna head vaimud (documentary, 1983)
 Naerata ometi (1985) (with Arvo Iho)
 Varastatud kohtumine (1988)

 source: EFIS

References

1923 births
1996 deaths
Gerasimov Institute of Cinematography alumni
Estonian women film directors
Burials at Pärnamäe Cemetery